The rivière des Hurons (English: Hurons River) flows for  to the east side spill in the Chambly Basin just north of the city of Chambly. Its mouth is in the municipality of Saint-Mathias-sur-Richelieu in the Rouville Regional County Municipality, in the administrative region of Montérégie, in Quebec, in Canada. Hurons River flows through the Les Maskoutains Regional County Municipality, RCM of La Vallée-du-Richelieu Regional County Municipality, then the western part of the MRC Rouville Regional County Municipality. The latter is entirely east of the Richelieu River.

Besides the village areas (or hamlets), agriculture is the main economic activity in this small valley.

The river surface is generally frozen from mid-December to the end of March. Safe traffic on the ice is generally from late December to early March. The water level of the river varies with the seasons and the precipitation.

Geography 

The head of the river watered many streams of the area north-west of Saint-Hyacinthe (sectors La Présentation, Saint-Charles-sur-Richelieu, Sainte-Marie-Madeleine (parish) and Sainte-Madeleine (village)). From its source, the river flows straight south. It cuts Highway 20, passes near Golf Club La Madeleine, cutting the Canadian National Railway tracks and Highway 116 about a mile west of the town of Sainte-Madeleine.

The river then passes between the Mont Rougemont and Mont Saint-Hilaire it bypasses remotely. Then runs almost straight up to the limit of Saint-Mathias-sur-Richelieu, close to the northern part of the former territory of Sainte-Marie-de-Monnoir (merged to Marieville in 2001). Hence, this small river cut Saint-Mathias-sur-Richelieu, diagonally across  by water) to enter the Richelieu River, south of the village of Saint-Mathias-sur-Richelieu and north of the city of Richelieu.

In its course, especially in agricultural areas, the river is bordered on the east side by Highway 227 (called "row South River" in the municipality and, of Sainte-Marie-Madeleine). On the other side of the river, the road is named "North River Row". While in Saint-Mathias-sur-Richelieu, the road "Huron River East" along the river to its mouth, while the road "West Huron River" runs a segment on the other side of the river.

Coordinates: -73.15527; 45.49528. Another designated hamlet "Hameau de Saint-Mathias-sur-Richelieu" is located 6 miles northeast of Chambly, on the left bank of the Hurons River. A post office named "The Hurons" has served this hamlet in the period February 1, 1909, to August 3, 1914. Decimal coordinates: -73.22361; 45.48306. While the bridge Great Huron is in La Présentation (municipality). Decimal coordinates: -73.10056; 45.62972.

Bridge Road Patriots (Route 133) crosses the small river close to its mouth.

Huron River has a low gradient. It course may be navigable by small boats on some segment, especially in the period of seasonal flooding. Several bridges farm spans the little river, especially in the north.

History 

In all of the La Vallée-du-Richelieu Regional County Municipality as well, this sub-watershed was conducive to hunting, fishing and agriculture in Native American prehistory. For millennia, the area was frequented by indigenous semi-nomadic.

European origin pioneers (or their descendants) have begun to colonize the territory from the late 17th century, especially in the vicinity of the Richelieu River.

Toponymy 

In October 1673, the first acts of the concessions granted by the Lord of Chambly refer to the river called "the Huron". In common usage, this potamonyme turned a century later as "Hurons River". This gazetteer adaptation is mentioned in Acts 1773.

At the beginning of the French colony in Canada, many villages Iroquoian (Iroquois and Huron) are established near the Richelieu River (mainly near the mouth of the river), taking advantage of the fur trade with the French authorities and barter with Native American communities.

In the history of New France, many indigenous communities came to settle near the French population centers for safety and supply.

The name "Huron River" was formalized December 5, 1968, at the bank of place names of the "Commission de toponymie du Québec" (Geographical Names Board of Québec)

See also 

 Richelieu River
 Les Maskoutains Regional County Municipality
 Rouville Regional County Municipality
 La Vallée-du-Richelieu Regional County Municipality
 La Présentation
 Saint-Charles-sur-Richelieu
 Sainte-Madeleine
 Sainte-Marie-Madeleine
 Saint-Mathias-sur-Richelieu
 Saint-Jean-Baptiste Day
 Huron-Wendat (disambiguation)
 List of rivers of Quebec

References

External links 
 Consultative Committee and VAlorization Basin Richelieu River

Rivers of Montérégie
La Vallée-du-Richelieu Regional County Municipality
Rouville Regional County Municipality
Les Maskoutains Regional County Municipality